Topmodel Africa is a reality TV series modelling competition run by the International Modelling School of Harare that premiered in July 2016 in Zimbabwe. The purpose of the competition is to award winners "top model" status in various categories. The overall winner for all categories is awarded the title of "Topmodel Africa". A second season was scheduled to be filmed in Rwanda in March 2020.

Judges

Seasons

Photo gallery

References

Top Model
English-language television shows
2016 television seasons